Ubacisi is a monotypic genus of African araneomorph spiders in the family Cyatholipidae containing the single species, Ubacisi capensis. It was first described by C. E. Griswold in 2001, and has only been found in South Africa.

References

Endemic fauna of South Africa
Cyatholipidae
Monotypic Araneomorphae genera
Spiders of South Africa